Thompson Glacier is a channel glacier draining northward to the head of Paulding Bay. Delineated by G.D. Blodgett (1955) from aerial photographs taken by Operation Highjump (1946–47). Named by Advisory Committee on Antarctic Names (US-ACAN) after Egbert Thompson, Midshipman on the sloop Wilkes.

See also
 List of glaciers in the Antarctic
 Glaciology

References
 

Glaciers of Wilkes Land